The House at 38 Salem Street in Wakefield, Massachusetts is a late Federal period house.  The -story wood-frame house is believed to have been built c. 1810, and has locally unusual features, including brick side walls and a hipped roof.  Its twin slender chimneys are indicative of late Federal styling.  The front entry is topped by an entablatured with a compressed frieze, and is flanked by three-quarter sidelight windows.

The house was listed on the National Register of Historic Places in 1989.

See also
National Register of Historic Places listings in Wakefield, Massachusetts
National Register of Historic Places listings in Middlesex County, Massachusetts

References

Houses on the National Register of Historic Places in Wakefield, Massachusetts
Federal architecture in Massachusetts
Houses completed in 1835
Houses in Wakefield, Massachusetts